{{DISPLAYTITLE:C3H8S}}
The molecular formula C3H8S (molar mass: 76.16 g/mol, exact mass: 76.0347 u) may refer to:

 1-Propanethiol
 2-Propanethiol
 

Molecular formulas